The Ernest S. and Clara C. Colby House is a historic residence in Hood River, Oregon, United States.

It was listed on the National Register of Historic Places in 2000.

See also

National Register of Historic Places listings in Hood River County, Oregon

References

External links

1905 establishments in Oregon
Houses completed in 1905
Houses in Hood River County, Oregon
Buildings and structures in Hood River, Oregon
Houses on the National Register of Historic Places in Oregon
National Register of Historic Places in Hood River County, Oregon
Queen Anne architecture in Oregon